The Château de Varax is a château in Marcilly-d'Azergues, Rhône, France. It was built in the 17th and 18th centuries. It has been listed as an official historical monument since December 26, 2012.

References

17th-century establishments in France
Châteaux in Rhône (department)
Monuments historiques of Auvergne-Rhône-Alpes